Bom Dia & Cia (also known as Eliana & Cia from 1997 to 1998 and Bom Dia & Companhia from 2009 to 2017) was a morning children's television show that aired on SBT from 2 August 1993 to 1 April 2022, being also known as the Brazilian children's program to have been on display for the longest time.

It is known to have followed several formats with different hosts and cartoons over the years. The show debuted focused on Eliana who was still at the beginning of her career as a children's hostess inspired by the success of other female hostesses like Xuxa and Angélica. The program became known for its simple and educational format, where Eliana sometimes received guests on the show and also interacted with puppet characters. The program became an audience success on the channel during the 90s and helped to raise Eliana's image, making her very popular with children with products that sold almost as much as Xuxa and Gugu Liberato.

After Eliana left SBT to work at RecordTV in 1998, the show was hosted by Jackeline Petkovic, commonly referred to as Jacky, which followed the same style left by Eliana with guests, educational activities and puppet characters. From 2003 onwards, as a means of reducing the budget, it began to have many youth host, with greater emphasis on Yudi Tamashiro, Priscilla Alcântara and Maisa Silva that followed a completely different format interacting with viewers via phone connections allowing them to win prizes such as computers, video games and toys. The show changed formats again in 2015 following a court injunction banning the use of children hosting TV shows, which resulted in the director Silvia Abravanel becoming the show's hostess until the final year.

The show has aired shows from various animation departments over the years, such as Disney, Warner Bros., Nickelodeon, DIC Entertainment and Mattel, as well as some anime.

Puppet characters 
During the first years that the show was hosted by Eliana and Jacky there were puppet characters who frequently interacted with the presenters. The use of puppet characters remained until 2003, even when the show was in the last months with Jacky, having been removed due to SBT's financial problems at that time.

 Fritz - A talking computer with arms and legs, he was Eliana's first supporting role and remained with Jacky until her first week. He did research on the subjects the program addressed and also helped Eliana in other sketches. He was voiced by  Edílson Oliveira da Silva.
 Melocoton - A purple chubby monster that acted in both Eliana's and Jacky's years. At first it debuted as a simple puppet with only its head visible, but it was later converted into a full-bodied puppet. The character was characterized by being a funny, good-natured and big eater monster. Due to Eliana's success on the show, Melocoton also derived his own products. The character was originally played by both Edílson Oliveira da Silva (providing the voice) and Hélio Eduardo Afonso (wearing the costume), both actors who would later become known as the characters Chiquinho and Pitoco on Eliana & Alegria. When Eliana moved to Record in 1998 to host Eliana & Alegria a similar character was created called Nhoc.
 Gugui - A little blue alien with powers. He was introduced in 2000 and remained Jacky's main supporting character along with the little child stagehand Michelle Giudice until early 2003. After his removal it was mentioned by Jacky that the character returned to his home planet. His design is somewhat reminiscent of Gizmo from Gremlins.
 Piu and Pia - A couple of birds that occasionally interacted with Jacky, Michelle and Gugui. Piu is the male and is blue while Pia is the female and is yellow. Like Gugui, they remained between 2000 and 2003.
 Ramon - A talking goldfish that lives inside an aquarium. Occasionally interacted with Jacky. Like Gugui, he remained between 2000 and 2003.

References

External links 
  

Sistema Brasileiro de Televisão original programming
Brazilian children's television series
Portuguese-language television shows
1993 Brazilian television series debuts
2022 Brazilian television series endings
Brazilian television shows featuring puppetry